The Three Tuns is a Grade II listed public house at 24 High Street, Uxbridge, London.

It was built in the 16th and 17th centuries.

References

Grade II listed buildings in the London Borough of Hillingdon
Grade II listed pubs in London
Pubs in the London Borough of Hillingdon
Uxbridge